Polymorphism in microRNA Target Site (PolymiRTS) is a database of naturally occurring DNA variations in putative microRNA target sites.

See also
MicroRNA
List of miRNA target prediction tools

References

External links
 http://compbio.uthsc.edu/miRSNP/

Biological databases
Mutation
RNA
MicroRNA